Sofia Gennadievna Gorschkova (1889-1972) was a Soviet botanist noted for her discovery of over thirty species of plants.

References 

1889 births
1972 deaths
Soviet women scientists
Soviet botanists